Half-Life 2: Episode Three is a canceled first-person shooter game developed by Valve. It was planned as the last in a trilogy of episodic games continuing the story of Half-Life 2 (2004). Valve announced Episode Three in May 2006, with a release planned for 2007. Following the cliffhanger ending of Episode Two (2007), it was widely anticipated. Marc Laidlaw, the writer for the Half-Life series, said he intended Episode Three to end the Half-Life 2 story arc.

Valve released little information on Episode Three over the following years, and in 2011 Wired described it as vaporware. Valve eventually canceled it as the developers felt the episodic format was limiting their ambition and they failed to settle on a direction. Additionally, Valve began developing a new game engine, Source 2, and delayed development of a new Half-Life until it was complete. Another Half-Life project led by Laidlaw, Borealis, was canceled in 2016. Laidlaw left Valve later that year.

In 2017, Laidlaw released a short story that journalists interpreted as a summary for what could have been the plot of Episode Three, though Laidlaw denied this. It followed the protagonist, Gordon Freeman, as he journeyed to the Arctic and boarded the Borealis, an experimental vessel created by Aperture Science. After Laidlaw posted the story, fans launched several projects attempting to recreate Episode Three. After canceling several further Half-Life games, Valve released a virtual reality game, Half-Life: Alyx, in 2020.

Premise 
Episode Three was to be the last in a trilogy of episodic games that would continue the story of Half-Life 2 (2004). Episode One was released on June 1, 2006, followed by Episode Two on October 10, 2007. Valve's president, Gabe Newell, said he considered the trilogy the equivalent of Half-Life 3.

According to Newell, whereas the original Half-Life (1998) saw the G-Man transform the protagonist, Gordon Freeman, into his tool, and Half-Life 2 saw Freeman being used by G-Man, the episodes would see G-Man lose control. In 2009, reports surfaced that Valve was working with sign language and on a deaf character. Newell said that Gordon's companion, Alyx Vance, had programmed her pet robot, Dog, to use sign language, inspired by a deaf person she had a crush on.

Marc Laidlaw, the writer for the Half-Life series, later said he had intended Episode Three to end the Half-Life 2 story arc, at which point he would "step away from it and leave it to the next generation". He planned an ending similar to previous games, with the player character, Gordon Freeman, left in "an indeterminate space, on hold ... So one cliffhanger after another ... I expected every installment would end without resolution, forever and ever."

Development 

Valve announced Episode Three in May 2006, planning to release it by Christmas 2007. Concept art surfaced in 2008. Valve released little information in the following years; though Valve still discussed Half-Life, there was no clarity on whether further games were coming. In March 2010, Newell spoke of "broadening the emotional palette" of the series, and said the next Half-Life game may return to "genuinely scaring the player". In 2011, he said: "We went through the episodes phase, and now we're going towards shorter and even shorter cycles ... For me, 'entertainment as a service' is a clear distillation of the episodic content model." That year, Wired described Episode Three as vaporware. Laidlaw left 2016. He said later that he had tired of the FPS format and had become "less interested in trying to solve the story problems inherent in a Half-Life style of narrative".

Valve eventually abandoned episodic development as they wanted to create more ambitious games. According to the level designer Dario Casali, "We found ourselves creeping ever forward towards, ‘Well, let's just keep putting more and more, and more, and more stuff in this game because we want to make it as good as we can,' and then we realized these episodes are turning more into sequels." Walker said Valve used Half-Life games to "solve some interesting collision of technology and art that had reared itself". When working on Episode Three, they failed to find a unifying idea that provided a sense of "wonderment, or opening, or expansion". Additionally, Valve had started developing a new game engine, Source 2. As developing Half-Life 2 and the original Source engine simultaneously had created problems, Valve delayed development of a new Half-Life until Source 2 was complete.

"Epistle 3" 

In 2017, a year after leaving Valve, Laidlaw posted a short story titled "Epistle 3" on his website. The story, described by the Verge as a gender-swapped "fanfic", features characters with names similar to Half-Life characters, such as "Gertie Fremont" for Gordon Freeman. 

Substituting the characters with their Half-Life counterparts, the story sees Freeman and the Lambda Resistance travel to the Arctic to board the Borealis, a ship with extradimensional technology that allows it to erratically travel through time and space, where they confront a myriad of alternative versions of themselves from different timelines. The group seizes control of the Borealis and set it on a collision course with the heart of the Combine empire. They rig it to self-destruct upon impact, annihilating the Combine's home planet and crippling their forces, but the explosion is not sufficient to destroy the Combine or their Dyson Sphere. Alyx is abducted by the G-Man. Gordon is rescued by the Vortigaunts just before the Borealis explodes, transported into the far future, with most of the Resistance dead and the success of their uprising left uncertain.

Laidlaw described the story as a "snapshot of a dream I had many years ago". Journalists interpreted it as a synopsis of what could have been the plot for Episode Three. Alternatively, it may have been intended for Borealis, another project led by Laidlaw. The designer Robin Walker denied that the story had been Valve's plan for Episode Three, and said that it was likely just one of many ideas by Laidlaw. In a 2023 interview, Laidlaw said he regretted publishing the story and said it was not representative of Episode Three, as "all the real story development can only happen in the crucible of developing the game". He described himself as "deranged" and "completely out of touch" at the time he published it, and felt it had created problems for his former colleagues at Valve.

Legacy 
Laidlaw's "Epistle 3" story led to a fan backlash; some players review bombed Valve's game Dota 2 on Steam, believing that Valve had forgone the Half-Life series. Project Borealis, an attempt to create a fanmade version of the episode in the Source engine that would be based on and expand on the short story, was announced. The team decided to switch to Unreal Engine to modernize the game, due to the lack of updates to Source.

Another team, Keep Away from Fire, began development of their own Episode Three project, Boreal Alyph, which did not follow "Epistle 3" as closely, and was initially set in Northern Russia before following Gordon Freeman across the globe. They stated their commitment to using the Source engine, describing it as a "constant fight" to modernize the graphics due to the engine's lack of user-friendliness or documentation.

After canceling several further Half-Life games, Valve released a VR game, Half-Life: Alyx, in 2020. Walker said the team saw VR as a way to return to the series. Phil Iwaunik of PCGamesN wrote in 2021 that the cancelation of Episode Three may have benefited the legacy of Half-Life 2, citing the lack of cultural impact of Alyx and the "mystery, speculation and melancholy" of an unfinished sequel.

References 

Half-Life (series)
Cancelled video games
Single-player video games
Video game memes